Oxypodini is a tribe of rove beetles in the family Staphylinidae. There are more than 50 genera and 580 described species in Oxypodini.

Genera
These 52 genera belong to the tribe Oxypodini:

 Acrimea Casey, 1911
 Alfocalea Klimaszewski in Klimaszewski & Pelletier, 2004
 Alisalia Casey, 1911
 Amarochara Thomson, 1858
 Apimela Mulsant & Rey, 1874
 Bamona Sharp, 1883
 Betocalea Klimaszewski in Klimaszewski & Pelletier, 2004
 Blepharhymenus Solier, 1849
 Brachyusa Mulsant & Rey, 1874
 Calodera Mannerheim, 1831
 Crataraea Thomson, 1858
 Decusa Casey, 1900
 Devia Blackwelder, 1952
 Dexiogyia Thomson, 1858
 Euthotorax Solier, 1849
 Gennadota Casey, 1906
 Gnathusa Fenyes, 1909
 Gnypeta Thomson, 1858
 Gnypetella Casey, 1906
 Gyronycha Casey, 1893
 Haploglossa Kraatz, 1856
 Hylota Casey, 1906
 Ilyobates Kraatz, 1856
 Leptobamona Casey, 1911
 Liometoxenus Kistner, Jensen & Jacobson, 2002
 Longipeltina Bernhauer, 1912
 Losiusa Seevers, 1978
 Megocalea Klimaszewski in Klimaszewski & Pelletier, 2004
 Melanalia Casey, 1911
 Meotica Mulsant & Rey, 1873
 Meronera Sharp, 1887
 Metocalea Klimaszewski in Klimaszewski & Pelletier, 2004
 Myrmobiota Casey, 1893
 Neoisoglossa Klimaszewski in Klimaszewski & Pelletier, 2004
 Neothetalia Klimaszewski in Klimaszewski & Pelletier, 2004
 Ocalea Erichson, 1837
 Ocyusa Kraatz, 1856
 Ocyustiba Lohse & Smetana, 1988
 Oxypoda Mannerheim, 1831
 Pachycerota Casey, 1906
 Paradilacra Bernhauer, 1909
 Parocalea Bernhauer, 1902
 Parocyusa Bernhauer, 1902
 Pentanota Bernhauer, 1905
 Phloeopora Erichson, 1837
 Pyraglossa Bernhauer, 1901
 Tachyusa Erichson, 1837
 Teliusa Casey, 1906
 Tetralaucopora Bernhauer, 1928
 Thiasophila Kraatz, 1856
 Thyasophila Fairmaire & Laboulbene, 1856
 Trachyota Casey, 1906

References

Further reading

External links

 

Aleocharinae
Articles created by Qbugbot
Beetle tribes